Nonlinear distortion is a term used (in fields such as electronics, audio and telecommunications) to describe the phenomenon of a non-linear relationship between the "input" and "output" signals of - for example - an electronic device.

Model
For many devices, a linear model is accurate only for small signal levels. For example, at 2 volts input, a typical audio amplifier might put out 20 V, meaning the linear gain is 10  V/V. For 3 V input, it might then output 30 V. However, the model implies that at 50 V input it would produce 500 V, which is not possible with most amplifiers.

Mathematically, the input-output relationship of many devices should be described by a polynomial or Taylor series, as shown below.

Effects of nonlinearity
Nonlinearity can have several effects, which are unwanted in typical situations.

In certain situations, this spurious signal can be filtered away because the "harmonic"  lies far outside the frequency range used, but in cable television, for example, third order distortion could cause a 200 MHz signal to interfere with the regular channel at 600 MHz. 

Nonlinear distortion applied to a superposition of two signals at different frequencies causes the circuit to act as a frequency mixer, creating intermodulation distortion.

Electrical parameters